Prom Night: Original Soundtrack from the Motion Picture is the soundtrack album of the 1980 Canadian psychological horror-thriller slasher film Prom Night.

Background
The Prom Night soundtrack was composed by Paul Zaza and Carl Zittrer, with additional writing by Bill Crutchfield and James Powell. Director Lynch sought Zittrer after hearing his compositions in Black Christmas (1974). The soundtrack of Prom Night includes several disco songs which are featured prominently in the film's prom scene. Originally, the film was shot with the actors dancing to then-popular tracks by Gloria Gaynor ("I Will Survive"), Donna SummerFrance Joli, Patrick Hernandez ("Born to Be Alive") and Cheryl Lynn ("Star Love") among others, but according to Zaza, the publishing rights to the songs were far outside the film's budget.

Under orders from producer Peter Simpson, Zaza wrote a series of disco songs over a five-day period, closely copying the original tracks that were intended to be used in the film. This resulted in a copyright lawsuit for $10 million, which was eventually settled for $50,000.

Release
The film's soundtrack is highly sought after by fans of the film and disco fans alike. It was originally released only in Japan on LP and cassette. A 7-inch single of "All Is Gone" b/w "Forever" was also released; however, neither of these songs appears in the film. The soundtrack was likely not released in North America due in part to disco's sharply declining popularity in the United States by 1980. Many bootleg CD releases have also found their way onto the marketplace. Some of the music used in the film was later reused in Canadian horror productions also scored by Paul Zaza, such as Ghostkeeper (1981) and Curtains (1983). 

In May 2019, Perseverance Records released the first official and complete CD release of the Prom Night soundtrack. Perseverance worked closely with Carl Zittrer and Paul Zaza to locate and unearth the original masters and all music recorded for the film including unreleased disco songs and score not used in the final production, never heard before anywhere.

Track listing

References

Sources

1980 soundtrack albums
Disco soundtracks
Prom Night (film series)
RCA Records soundtracks
1980 albums